Aleksandr Petrovich Petrov (Russian: Александр Петрович Петров; 23 September 1876 – February 1941) was a Greco-Roman wrestler from Russia. He won a silver medal at the 1908 Olympics after losing in the final to Richárd Weisz.

Petrov's father was an honored citizen of Yelets. He paid much attention to education of his son, and sent him to Moscow to study at a university and then at a military medical academy, where Petrov took up wrestling as part of his physical training. He also competed in gymnastics, swimming, cross-country skiing, speedskating, athletics, fencing, boxing and cycling, and later became a military sports coach and doctor. He still competed around 1930 in speedskating in the masters category, but his health rapidly deteriorated in 1938, after his right leg was amputated due to a congenital disease. He died less than three years later and was survived by his wife Serafima.

References

External links
 

1876 births
1941 deaths
Olympic competitors for the Russian Empire
Wrestlers at the 1908 Summer Olympics
Male sport wrestlers from the Russian Empire
Olympic silver medalists from the Russian Empire
Olympic medalists in wrestling
Medalists at the 1908 Summer Olympics